On 2 September 2018, Bareunmirae Party held a leadership election.

Background 
This was a snap election called after the resignation of both Yoo Seong-min and Park Joo-sun due to the serious defeat in local elections in 2018. Until the new leadership election, the party's presidency was temporarily taken by Kim Dong-cheol, party's parliamentary leader.

Candidates

Official candidates 
 Ha Tae-keung
 Chung Woon-cheon
 Kim Young-hwan
 Sohn Hak-kyu
 Lee Jun-seok
 Kwon Eun-hui

Withdrawn candidates 
Below are candidates lost in primary on 11 August.

 Shin Yong-hyun
 Chang Song-min
 Chang Song-chol
 Lee Su-bong

Results 

Sohn Hak-kyu, former Governor of Gyeonggi Province, won as the President. Incumbent MP Ha Tae-keung and entrepreneur Lee Jun-seok that came behind of Sohn, became Vice Presidents. Kwon Eun-hui, despite ended as the 6th and the last, automatically took vice presidency specialised for women.

Other than that, Kim Soo-min, an incumbent MP, was elected as the party's Youth Chief.

References 

Bareunmirae Party
Political party leadership elections in South Korea
Bareunmirae Party leadership election